Adnan Mohammed or Adnan Mohammad may refer to:

 Adnan Muhammed Ali Al Saigh, Saudi detainee at Guantanamo Bay
 Adnan Mohammad (born 1996), Danish footballer